Naroa Uriarte Urazurrutia (born 5 February 2001) is a Spanish footballer who plays as a defender for Athletic Club.

Club career
Uriarte started her career in Bizkerre's academy.

In December 2021, she tore the anterior cruciate ligament in her right knee, with the injury keeping her out for almost a year.

International career
Uriarte was a member of the Spain under-17 squad that won the 2018 UEFA Women's Under-17 Championship in Lithuania and the 2018 FIFA U-17 Women's World Cup in Uruguay.

References

External links
 
 
 
 

2001 births
Living people
Women's association football defenders
Spanish women's footballers
Athletic Club Femenino players
Primera División (women) players
Segunda Federación (women) players
Footballers from Bilbao
Athletic Club Femenino B players
Spain women's youth international footballers